Pego may refer to:

 Pego (Abrantes), a Portuguese parish, located in the municipality of Abrantes
 Pego, Alicante, a Spanish municipality located in the province of Alicante